Zarrina Mihaylova (née Ganieva, born 29 November 1982 in Bekabad) is an Uzbekistani rower.

References

External links

Uzbekistani female rowers
Living people
1982 births
Asian Games medalists in rowing
Rowers at the 2002 Asian Games
Rowers at the 2006 Asian Games
Rowers at the 2010 Asian Games
Asian Games gold medalists for Uzbekistan
Asian Games bronze medalists for Uzbekistan
Medalists at the 2002 Asian Games
Medalists at the 2006 Asian Games
Medalists at the 2010 Asian Games
21st-century Uzbekistani women